The 2020 ITF Men's World Tennis Tour is the 2020 edition of the second tier tour for men's professional tennis. It is organised by the International Tennis Federation and is a tier below the ATP Tour. The ITF Men's World Tennis Tour includes tournaments with prize money ranging from $15,000 to $25,000.

The tour restarted on 17 August having been suspended since 13 March due to the COVID-19 pandemic.

Key

Month

July 
No tournaments held due to the coronavirus pandemic

August

September

References

External links
 International Tennis Federation official website

 3